The Russian Navy ensign, also known as St. Andrew's flag (Russian Pre-reform: Андреевскій флагъ), was the ensign of the Navy of the Russian Empire (from 1712 to 1918), and is the naval ensign of the Russian Federation since 1992, and the banner of the Navy of the Russian Federation since 2000.

The flag has a white background with two blue diagonal bands, forming a saltire, called St Andrew's Cross. The ratio of the flag's width to its length is 1 / 1.5, the width of the blue band is 1 / 10 the length of the flag.

The Guard Ribbon and image of order awarded to the ship can be added to the flag.

History
In 1698 Peter I the Great established the first Russian medal, the Order of St Andrew, which is to be awarded for military exploits and public service. When he became tsar, he started to devise a flag for the Russian Navy. The symbolism of the flag is a tribute to his father, Alexey Mikhaylovich Romanov, who established a special flag for the first Russian naval ship, the three-masted frigate .

From 1692 to 1712 Peter I personally drew eight proposed flags that have consistently been taken into the Navy. Description of the flag's final version by Peter I:

Original Text (Orthography and font (ru) are also original):

Modern Russian:

After the Russian revolution, the Russian Navy Ensign was changed, but it was used by the White Army up to 1924. The flag of St Andrew was reintroduced in the Russian Navy in 1992, and is still used today.

References

See also
 Alexander Gordon (general)
 Patrick Gordon
 Thomas Gordon (Royal Scots Navy officer)
 Flag of Scotland, similar but white on blue
 List of Russian navy flags
 List of Soviet navy flags
 Marsaxlokk, fishing village on Malta with a similar flag

Russian Navy
Flags of Russia
Saltire flags
1712 establishments in Russia
1992 establishments in Russia
1712 in military history
1992 in military history
Russia